Agyneta paraprosecta is a species of sheet weaver found in the United Arab Emirates. It was described by Tanasevitch in 2010.

References

paraprosecta
Spiders described in 2010
Spiders of the Arabian Peninsula